The Chenismus Forest Reserve was established in Oregon by the U.S. Forest Service on May 12, 1905 with . On March 1, 1907 it was combined with the first Wallowa National Forest to create Imnaha National Forest and the name was discontinued. Its lands presently exist as a portion of Wallowa–Whitman National Forest.

References

External links
Forest History Society
Forest History Society:Listing of the National Forests of the United States Text from Davis, Richard C., ed. Encyclopedia of American Forest and Conservation History. New York: Macmillan Publishing Company for the Forest History Society, 1983. Vol. II, pp. 743-788.

Former National Forests of Oregon
Defunct forest reserves of the United States
1905 establishments in Oregon
Protected areas established in 1905
1907 disestablishments in Oregon